The 1836 United States presidential election in Vermont took place between November 3 and December 7, 1836, as part of the 1836 United States presidential election. Voters chose seven representatives, or electors to the Electoral College, who voted for President and Vice President.

Vermont voted for Whig candidate William Henry Harrison over Democratic candidate Martin Van Buren. Harrison won Vermont by a margin of 19.86%.

This would be the final time a Democratic candidate would carry Essex County until Franklin D. Roosevelt won it 104 years later in 1940.

1836 would stand as the strongest performance for a Democratic candidate in Vermont until 96 years later in 1932, when Franklin D. Roosevelt performed slightly better with 41.08%.

Harrison would later win Vermont again four years later when he successfully defeated Van Buren.

Results

See also
 United States presidential elections in Vermont

References

Vermont
1836
1836 Vermont elections